USS Walter X. Young has been the name of more than one United States Navy ship, but only one that was actually completed and served in the Navy:

  a  whose construction order was canceled in 1944
 USS Walter X. Young (DE-715), a Rudderow-class destroyer that was escort converted during construction into the fast transport .

See also
 
 

United States Navy ship names